William Scott Earl (born September 18, 1960) is a retired Major League Baseball second baseman. He was raised in North Vernon, IN and graduated from Jennings County High School. He played during one season at the major league level for the Detroit Tigers. He was drafted by the Tigers in the 14th round of the 1981 amateur draft.

External links

1960 births
Living people
Detroit Tigers players
Major League Baseball second basemen
Baseball players from Indiana
Bristol Tigers players
Lakeland Tigers players
Birmingham Barons players
Evansville Triplets players
Nashville Sounds players
Toledo Mud Hens players
Columbus Clippers players
Eastern Kentucky Colonels baseball players